Fred Drains (born January 10, 1971) is an American-Swedish former professional basketball player. Drains played the majority of his career in Sweden, where was named Basketligan MVP four times.

College career
Drains attended Woodstown High School in Woodstown, New Jersey, before playing for Kean College (now Kean University, where he was selected to New Jersey Athletic Conference all-conference basketball first team and recognized as player of the year as a junior in the 1991–1992 season.

Professional career
In 1993 he was in the NBA Draft, but failed to be drafted. Moving to Sweden and being naturalized, he played power forward for the Norrköping Dolphins and later on for Plannja Basket, both in the Basketligan, the premier league for professional basketball in Sweden.

He was picked as Basketligan MVP four times making him the most decorated basketball player winning the Swedish League MVP Awards: He was Sweden' basketball MVP for seasons 2000–01 and 2001–02 while in the Norrköping Dolphins and in seasons 2004–05 and 2006–07 while playing for Plannja Basket.

See also
Basketligan MVP

References

1971 births
Living people
08 Stockholm Human Rights players
American expatriate basketball people in Sweden
American men's basketball players
Basketball players from New Jersey
Forwards (basketball)
Kean Cougars
Norrköping Dolphins players
People from Salem, New Jersey
People from Woodstown, New Jersey
Sportspeople from Salem County, New Jersey
Swedish men's basketball players
Woodstown High School alumni